Highway 709 is a highway in the Canadian province of Saskatchewan. It runs from Highway 48  near Kipling to Highway 600.

Route description 
In  Highway 709 intersects the Trans-Canada Highway at the town of Moosomin. Highway 709 ends at the intersection with  Highway 600 near the Manitoba border. Access to Moosomin Lake Regional Park is from Highway 709.

Major intersections

See also 
Roads in Saskatchewan
Transportation in Saskatchewan

References

External links 
Saskatchewan Highways Website-- Highway Numbering 
Saskatchewan Road Map RV Itineraries 
Big Things of Canada, A Celebration of Community Monuments of Canada 
Online Historical Map Digitization Project

709